The tumor microenvironment (TME) is the environment around a tumor, including the surrounding blood vessels, immune cells, fibroblasts, signaling molecules and the extracellular matrix (ECM). The tumor and the surrounding microenvironment are closely related and interact constantly. Tumors can influence the microenvironment by releasing extracellular signals, promoting tumor angiogenesis and inducing peripheral immune tolerance, while the immune cells in the microenvironment can affect the growth and evolution of cancerous cells.

History 

The importance of a stromal microenvironment, especially "wound" or regenerating tissue, has been recognized since the late 1800s. The interplay between the tumor and its microenvironment was part of Stephen Paget's 1889 "seed and soil" theory, in which he postulated that metastases of a particular type of cancer ("the seed") often metastasizes to certain sites ("the soil") based on the similarity of the original and secondary tumor sites.

Its role in blunting an immune attack awaited the discovery of adaptive cellular immunity. In 1960, Klein and colleagues found that in mice, primary methylcholanthrene-induced sarcomas exhibited an antitumor immune response mediated by lymph node cells to cancer cells derived from the primary tumor. This immune response did not however affect the primary tumor. The primary tumor instead established a microenvironment that is functionally analogous to that of certain normal tissues, such as the eye.

Later, mice experiments by Halachmi and Witz showed that for the same cancer cell line, greater tumorigenicity was evident in vivo than the same strain inoculated in vitro.

Unambiguous evidence for the inability in humans of a systemic immune response to eliminate immunogenic cancer cells was provided by Boon's 1991 studies of antigens that elicit specific CD8+ T cell responses in melanoma patients. One such antigen was MAGE-A1. The coexistence of a progressing melanoma with melanoma-specific T cells implicitly does not involve immunoediting, but does not exclude the possibility of TME immune suppression.

The discovery of melanoma-specific T cells in patients led to the strategy of adoptively transferring large numbers of in vitro-expanded tumor-infiltrating lymphocytes (TILs) which has proven that the immune system has the potential to control cancer. However, adoptive T cell therapy (ACT) with TILs has not had the dramatic success of ACT with virus-specific CD8+ T cells. The TME of solid cancers appears to be fundamentally different from that of the leukemias, in which clinical ACT trials with chimeric antigen receptor T cells have demonstrated efficacy.

Vasculature 

80–90% of cancer are carcinomas, or cancers that form from epithelial tissue. This tissue is not vascularized, which prevents tumors from growing greater than 2mm in diameter without inducing new blood vessels. Angiogenesis is upregulated to feed the cancer cells, and as a result the vasculature formed differs from that of normal tissue.

Enhanced permeability and retention effect 

The enhanced permeability and retention effect (EPR) is the observation that the vasculature of tumors is often leaky and accumulates molecules in the blood stream to a greater extent than in normal tissue. This inflammation effect is not only seen in tumors, but in hypoxic areas of cardiac muscles following a myocardial infarction. This permeable vasculature is thought to have several causes, including insufficient pericytes and a malformed basement membrane.

Hypoxia 

The tumor microenvironment is often hypoxic. As the tumor mass increases, the interior of the tumor becomes farther away from existing blood supply. While angiogenesis can reduce this effect, the partial pressure of oxygen is below 5 mm Hg (venous blood has a partial pressure of oxygen at 40 mm Hg) in more than 50% of locally advanced solid tumors. The hypoxic environment leads to genetic instability, which is associated with cancer progression, via downregulating DNA repair mechanisms such as nucleotide excision repair (NER) and mismatch repair (MMR) pathways. Hypoxia also causes the upregulation of hypoxia-inducible factor 1 alpha (HIF1-α), which induces angiogenesis and is associated with poorer prognosis and the activation of genes associated with metastasis, leading, for instance, to increased cell migration and also ECM remodeling.

While a lack of oxygen can cause glycolytic behavior in cells, some tumor cells also undergo aerobic glycolysis, in which they preferentially produce lactate from glucose even given abundant oxygen, called the Warburg effect. No matter the cause, this leaves the extracellular microenvironment acidic (pH 6.5–6.9), while the cancer cells themselves are able to remain neutral (ph 7.2–7.4). It has been shown that this induces greater cell migration in vivo and in vitro, possibly by promoting degradation of the ECM.

Stromal cells 
In cancer biology, the stroma is defined as the nonmalignant cells which are present in the tumor microenvironment. The stroma comprises a variable portion of the entire tumor; up to 90% of a tumor may be stroma, with the remaining 10% as cancer cells. Many types of cells are present in the stroma, but four abundant types are fibroblasts, T cells, macrophages, and endothelial cells. The stroma surrounding a tumor often reacts to intrusion via inflammation, similar to how it might respond to a wound. Inflammation can encourage angiogenesis, speed the cell cycle and prevent cell death, all of which augments tumor growth.

Carcinoma associated fibroblasts 

Carcinoma associated fibroblasts (CAFs) are a heterogenous group of fibroblasts whose function is pirated by cancer cells and redirected toward carcinogenesis. These cells are usually derived from the normal fibroblasts in the surrounding stroma but can also come from pericytes, smooth muscle cells, fibrocytes, mesenchymal stem cells (MSCs, often derived from bone marrow), or via epithelial-mesenchymal transition (EMT) or endothelial-mesenchymal transition (EndMT). Unlike their normal counterparts, CAFs do not retard cancer growth in vitro. CAFs perform several functions that support tumor growth, such as secreting vascular endothelial growth factor (VEGF), fibroblast growth factors (FGFs), platelet-derived growth factor (PDGF), and other pro-angiogenic signals to induce angiogenesis. CAFs can also secrete transforming growth factor beta (TGF-β), which is associated with EMT, a process by which cancer cells can metastasize, and is associated with inhibiting cytotoxic T cells and natural killer T cells. As fibroblasts, CAFs are able to rework the ECM to include more paracrine survival signals such as IGF-1 and IGF-2, thus promoting survival of the surrounding cancer cells. CAFs are also associated with the Reverse Warburg Effect where the CAFs perform aerobic glycolysis and feed lactate to the cancer cells.

Several markers identify CAFs, including expression of α smooth muscle actin (αSMA), vimentin, platelet-derived growth factor receptor α (PDGFR-α), platelet-derived growth factor receptor β (PDGFR-β), fibroblast specific protein 1 (FSP-1) and fibroblast activation protein (FAP). None of these factors can be used to differentiate CAFs from all other cells by itself.

Extracellular matrix remodeling 

Fibroblasts are in charge of laying down most of the collagens, elastin, glycosaminoglycans, proteoglycans (e.g. perlecan), and glycoproteins in the ECM. As many fibroblasts are transformed into CAFs during carcinogenesis, this reduces the amount of ECM produced and the ECM that is produced can be malformed, like collagen being loosely woven and non-planar, possibly even curved. In addition, CAFs produce matrix metalloproteinases (MMP) that cleave the proteins within the ECM. CAFs are also able to disrupt the ECM via force, generating a track that a carcinoma cell can follow. In either case, destruction of the ECM allows cancer cells to escape from their in situ location and intravasate into the blood stream where they can metastasize systematically. It can also provide passage for endothelial cells to complete angiogenesis to the tumor site.

Destruction of the ECM also modulates the signaling cascades controlled by the interaction of cell-surface receptors and the ECM,  and it also reveals binding sites previously hidden, like the integrin alpha-v beta-3 (αVβ3) on the surface of melanoma cells can be ligated to rescue the cells from apoptosis after degradation of collagen. In addition, the degradation products may have downstream effects as well that can increase cancer cell tumorigenicity and can serve as potential biomarkers. ECM destruction also releases the cytokines and growth factors stored therein (for example, VEGF, basic fibroblast growth factor (bFGF), insulin-like growth factors (IGF1 and IGF2), TGF-β, EGF, heparin-binding EGF-like growth factor (HB-EGF), and tumor necrosis factor (TNF), which can increase the growth of the tumor. Cleavage of ECM components can also release cytokines that inhibit tumorigenesis, such as degradation of certain types of collagen can form endostatin, restin, canstatin and tumstatin, which have antiangiogenic functions.

ECM stiffening is associated with tumor progression. This stiffening may be partially attributed to CAFs secreting lysyl oxidase (LOX), an enzyme that cross-links the collagen IV found in the ECM.

Immune cells

Myeloid-derived suppressor cells and tumor associated macrophages 

Myeloid-derived suppressor cells (MDSCs) are a heterogenous population of cells of myelogenous origin with the potential to repress T cell responses. They regulate wound repair and inflammation and are rapidly expanded in cancer, correlating with that signs of inflammation are seen in most if not all tumor sites. Tumors can produce exosomes that stimulate inflammation via MDSCs. This group of cells include some tumor associated macrophages (TAMs). TAMs are a central component in the strong link between chronic inflammation and cancer. TAMs are recruited to the tumor as a response to cancer-associated inflammation.  Unlike normal macrophages, TAMs lack cytotoxic activity. TAMs have been induced in vitro by exposing macrophage progenitors to different immune regulatory cytokines, such as interleukin 4 (IL-4) and interleukin 13 (IL-13). TAMs gather in necrotic regions of tumors where they are associated with hiding cancer cells from normal immune cells by secreting interleukin 10 (IL-10), aiding angiogenesis by secreting vascular endothelial growth factor (VEGF) and nitric oxide synthase(NOS), supporting tumor growth by secreting epidermal growth factor (EGF) and remodeling the ECM. TAMs show sluggish NF-κB activation, which allows for the smoldering inflammation seen in cancer. An increased amount of TAMs is associated with worse prognosis. TAMs represent a potential target for novel cancer therapies.

TAMs are associated with using exosomes to deliver invasion-potentiating microRNA (miRNA) into cancerous cells, specifically breast cancer cells.

Neutrophils 
Neutrophils are polymorphonuclear immune cells that are critical components of the innate immune system. Neutrophils can accumulate in tumors and in some cancers, such as lung adenocarcinoma, their abundance at the tumor site is associated with worsened disease prognosis. When compared among 22 different tumor infiltrating leukocyte (TIL) subsets, neutrophils are especially important in diverse cancers, as illustrated by a meta analysis of thousands of human tumors from various histologies (termed PRECOG) led by Ash Alizadeh and colleagues at Stanford.  Neutrophil numbers (and myeloid cell precursors) in the blood can be increased in some patients with solid tumors. Experiments in mice have mainly shown that tumor-associated neutrophils exhibit tumor-promoting functions, but a smaller number of studies show that neutrophils can also inhibit tumor growth. Neutrophil phenotypes are diverse and distinct neutrophil phenotypes in tumors have been identified. In mice, neutrophils and 'granulocytic myeloid derived suppressor cells' are often identified by the same cell surface antibodies using flow cytometry and it is unclear whether these are overlapping or distinct populations.

Tumor infiltrating lymphocytes 

Tumor infiltrating lymphocytes (TILs) are lymphocytes that penetrate a tumor. TILs have a common origin with myelogenous cells at the hematopoietic stem cell, but diverge in development. Concentration is generally positively correlated. However, only in melanoma has autologous TIL transplant succeeded as a treatment. Cancer cells induce apoptosis of activated T cells (a class of lymphocyte) by secreting exosomes containing death ligands such as FasL and TRAIL, and via the same method, turn off the normal cytotoxic response of natural killer cells (NK cells). This suggests that cancer cells actively work to restrain TILs.

T cells 
Preclinical mice studies implicate CAFs, TAMs and myelomonocytic cells (including several myeloid-derived suppressor cells (MDSCs)) in restricting T cell accumulation near cancer cells. Overcoming this restriction, combined with a T cell checkpoint antagonist, revealed enhanced antitumor effects. Tumor vasculature also plays an active role in restricting T cell entry into the TME.

T cells reach tumor sites via the circulatory system. The TME appears to preferentially recruit other immune cells over T cells from that system. One such mechanism is the release of cell-type specific chemokines. Another is the TME's capacity to posttranslationally alter chemokines. For example, the production of reactive nitrogen species by MDSCs within the TME induces nitration of CCL2 (N-CCL2), which traps T cells in the stroma of colon and prostate cancers. N-CCL2 does attract monocytes. CCL2 nitration inhibitors enhanced the accumulation of TILs in the corresponding animal models and resulted in improved efficacy of ACT.

Another T cell inhibitor appears to be the apoptosis inducer Fas ligand (FasL) that is found in the tumor vasculature of tumor types including ovarian, colon, prostate, breast, bladder and renal cancer. High levels of endothelial FasL are accompanied by few CD8+ T cells, but abundant regulatory T cells (Tregs). In preclinical models inhibiting FasL increased the ratio of tumor-rejecting T cells to Treg cells and T cell–dependent tumor suppression. FasL inhibition also improves ACT efficacy. For many cancers, an increased frequency of in the tumor microenvironment is associated with worse outcomes for the individual. This is not the case with colorectal cancer; an increased frequency of Treg cells may suppress inflammation mediated by the gut flora, which promotes tumor growth.

In ovarian cancer elevated VEGF levels and expression of the immune regulatory ligand B7H3 (CD276), or the endothelin B receptor (ETBR) on tumor vessels correlate with decreased T cell infiltration and worse clinical outcome. Pharmacological inhibition of ETBR increased T cell adhesion to endothelial cells in an intercellular adhesion molecule-1 (ICAM-1)–dependent manner, increasing TIL numbers in mice and a corresponding tumor response. Anti-angiogenic inhibitors targeting VEGF and its receptor VEGFR2 (approved for treatment of multiple cancers) induce vascular normalization. This, in turn, increases TILs and improves ACT and vaccine efficacy in preclinical models. VEGF impairs DC maturation, offering another means to enhance intratumoral immune responses. Deleting the regulator of G-protein signaling, Rgs5 reduced vessel leakiness and hypoxia, enhanced T cell infiltration into mouse pancreatic neuroendocrine tumors, and prolonged animal survival. Vascular normalization is thus likely more effective than vessel destruction. Targeted delivery of tumor necrosis factor-α (TNF-α) was reported to normalize tumor blood vessels, increase CD8+ T cell infiltration and enhance vaccine and ACT therapies, unlike inflammatory cytokines interferon-γ (IFN-γ).

Reproduction 
T cells must reproduce after arriving at the tumor site to further increase their numbers, survive the TME's hostile elements and migrate through the stroma to the cancer cells. The TME obstructs all three activities. The draining lymph nodes are the likely location for T cell clonal reproduction, although this also occurs within the tumor. Preclinical models suggest that the TME is the major site of cancer-specific T cell cloning and that the CD8+ T cell replicative response there is orchestrated by the CD103+, Baft3-dependent DC, which can efficiently cross-present cancer cell antigens, suggesting that therapeutic interventions that enhance CD103+ contribute to tumor control. Among such strategies are antibodies to the interleukin-10 receptor (IL10R). In a mammary carcinoma mouse model it neutralized the effects of TAM-produced IL10, relieved the suppression of IL12 production by intratumoral DCs and improved the CD8+ T cell–dependent antitumor effects of chemotherapy. A similar outcome was achieved by neutralizing macrophage colony-stimulating factor 1, which impaired the intratumoral accumulation of TAMs. Another strategy is the administration of antibody-interferon-β (IFN-β) complexes that activate intratumoral DCs to cross-present antigen to CD8+ T cells. They are targeted against oncogenic receptors such as epidermal growth factor receptor (EGFR).

Tumor eradication resulted when PD-L1 (also induced by IFN-β acting on DCs) was neutralized. DC function also may be adversely affected by the TME's hypoxic conditions, which induces PD-L1 expression on DCs and other myelomonocytic cells as a result of hypoxia-inducible factors-1α (HIF-1α) binding directly to a hypoxia-responsive element in the PD-L1 promoter. Even the aerobic glycolysis of cancer cells may antagonize local immune reactions via increasing lactate production, which induces the M2 TAM polarization. An M1 to M2 phenotypic transition of intratumoral macrophages was reported after the induction of cancer cell apoptosis in human and mouse gastrointestinal stromal tumors by KIT oncoprotein inhibitor imatinib. The designation of M1 and M2 polarization states over-simplify macrophage biology, since at least six different TAM subpopulations are known. Therefore, TME TAM phenotype descriptors are likely important.

The TME may also directly impair intratumoral T cell proliferation. Indole 2,3-dioxygenase (IDO)—which can be expressed by DCs, MDSCs and cancer cells—catabolizes tryptophan and generates kynurenine. Both the deprivation of tryptophan and the generation of its metabolic product inhibit clonal T cell expansion. IDO also promotes the conversion of T cells to Treg cells and increases IL-6 expression, which augments MDSC functions. Accordingly, IDO1 genetic deficiency is associated with reduced tumor burden and metastasis and enhanced survival in mouse models of lung and breast cancer. The therapeutic potential of inhibiting IDO, in combination with anti-CTLA-4 was demonstrated in the B16 melanoma model and was associated with increased intratumoral T cells. IDO's capacity to block Treg cell to helperlike cell reprogramming by sustaining transcription factor Eos and the transcriptional program it regulates, also suppresses the immune response.

Apoptosis 
The TME can limit T cell  viability. Both IDO and PD-L1 may induce T cell apoptosis. Myelomonocytic cell products that cause apoptosis include FasL, TNF-α, and TNF-related apoptosis-inducing ligand (TRAIL). Ppp2r2d is a key regulator promoting T cell apoptosis and suppressing T cell proliferation.

TAMs and MDSCs 
Targeting intratumoral TAMs and MDSCs can also reduce tumor burdens in preclinical models, in both T cell–dependent and T cell–independent ways. For instance, inhibiting chemokine receptor type 2 (CCR2), colony-stimulating factor-1 receptor (CSF-1R) and granulocyte macrophage colony-stimulating factor (GM-CSF) in preclinical models of melanoma, pancreatic, breast, and prostatic carcinoma increased T cells and restricted tumor growth. The effect was enhanced by anti-CTLA-4 or anti-PD-1/PD-L1. These studies did not determine whether the increases in T cells were a consequence of viability or replication.

Inhibition of CSF-1R in a preclinical proneural glioblastoma multiforme model and in patient-derived glioma xenografts increased survival and shrank established tumors in an apparently T cell–independent manner that correlated with the reprogramming of macrophages away from an M2 phenotype. Similarly, an activator of TAMs, an agonistic antibody to CD40, when administered in combination with the chemotherapeutic drug gemcitabine, suppressed mouse PDA growth in a T cell–independent manner, suggesting that stimulated macrophages may have anticancer functions.

B cells regulate TAM phenotypes in squamous cell carcinoma TME. Correspondingly, B cell depletion reprogrammed TAMs, thus reducing their suppression of CD8 cells and enhancing chemotherapy. An autochthonous melanoma mouse model depleted Treg cells and neutralized IL-10, revealing tumor-killing properties. TAMs mediate the effects of antitumor antibodies and genetically engineered ligands that interact with CD47 to prevent the CD47/signal regulatory protein–α (SIRPα) signaling system from suppressing antibody-coated cancer cell phagocytosis.

Spatial distribution 
CAFs restrict T cell distribution by two means. They can physically exclude them, as mediated by their extracellular matrix. T cell motility was higher in regions of loose fibronectin and collagen than in dense matrix areas surrounding tumor nests. Collagenase added to reduce matrix rigidity or chemokine CCL5 experimentally produced by tumor cells increased movement into contact with cancer cells.

They can also exclude them via biosynthesis of CXCL12. Conditionally depleting these cells from the stroma of an ectopic, transplanted tumor and of an autochthonous pancreatic ductal adenocarcinoma (PDA) allowed T cells to rapidly control tumor growth. However, the depletion must be limited to the TME, because these cells carry out essential functions in several normal tissues. "Reprogramming" FAP+ cells in the TME with a vitamin D analog may neutralize them. Another approach may block their immune suppressive mechanism. In a preclinical PDA mouse model, FAP+ CAFs produced the chemokine CXCL12, which is bound by PDA cancer cells. Because FAP+ stromal cells also accumulate in nontransformed, inflammatory lesions, this "coating" of cancer cells may reflect a means by which "injured" epithelial cells protect themselves from immune attack. Administering an inhibitor of CXCL12 receptor CXCR4 caused the rapid spread of T cells among cancer cells, arrested tumor growth and stimulated tumor sensitivity to anti-PD-L1.

Clinical implications

Drug development 

High throughput cancer therapeutics screens are performed in vitro without the accompanying microenvironment. However, studies also investigate the effects of supportive stroma cells and their resistance to therapy. The latter studies revealed interesting therapeutic targets in the microenvironment including integrins and chemokines. These were missed by initial screens for anti-cancer drugs and might also help explain why so few drugs are highly potent in vivo.

Nanocarrier vehicles (~20–200 nm in diameter) can transport drugs and other therapeutic molecules. These therapies can be targeted to selectively extravasate through tumor vasculature via the EPR effect. Nanocarriers are now considered the gold standard of targeted cancer therapy because it can target tumors that are hypovascularized, such as prostate and pancreatic tumors. These efforts include protein capsids and liposomes. However, as some important, normal tissues, such as the liver and kidneys, also have fenestrated endothelium, the nanocarrier size (10–100 nm, with greater retention in tumors seen in using larger nanocarriers) and charge (anionic or neutral) must be considered. Lymphatic vessels do not usually develop with the tumor, leading to increased interstitial fluid pressure, which may block tumor access.

Therapies

Antibodies 
Bevacizumab is clinically approved in the US to treat a variety of cancers by targeting VEGF-A, which is produced by both CAFs and TAMs, thus slowing angiogenesis.

Targeting immunoregulatory membrane receptors succeeded in some patients with melanoma, non-small-cell lung carcinoma, urothelial bladder cancer and renal cell cancer. In mice, anti-CTLA-4 therapy leads to clearance from the tumor of Foxp3+ regulatory T cells (Treg cells) whose presence may impair effector T cell function. Similarly anti-PD-1/anti-PD-L1 therapy blocks the inhibitory PD-1 receptor. Other, potentially more fundamental TME inhibitory reactions (as in microsatellite stable colorectal cancer, ovarian cancer, prostate cancer, and PDA have yet to be overcome. The TME appears to aid in excluding killer T cells from the vicinity of cancer cells.

Kinase inhibitors 
Many other small molecule kinase inhibitors block the receptors for the growth factors released, thus making the cancer cell deaf to much of the paracrine signaling produced by CAFs and TAMs. These inhibitors include sunitinib, pazopanib, sorafenib and axitinib, all of which inhibit platelet derived growth factor receptors (PDGF-Rs) and VEGF receptors (VEGFRs). Cannabidiol (a cannabis derivate without psychoactive effects) has also been shown to inhibit the expression of VEGF in Kaposi's sarcoma. Natalizumab is a monoclonal antibody that targets a molecule responsible for cell adhesion (integrin VLA-4) and has promising in vitro activity in B cell lymphomas and leukemias.

Trabectedin has immunomodulatory effects that inhibit TAMs.

Liposomes 
Liposome formulations encapsulate anti-cancer drugs for selective uptake to tumors via the EPR effect. They are included Doxil and Myocet, both of which encapsulate doxorubicin (a DNA intercalator and common chemotherapeutic); DaunoXome, which encapsulates daunorubicin (a similar DNA intercalator); and Onco-TCS, which encapsulates vincristine (a molecule that induces formation of microtubules, dysregulating cell division). Another novel utilization of the EPR effect comes from Protein-bound paclitaxel (marketed under the trade name Abraxane) where paclitaxel is bound to albumin to add bulk and aid delivery.

See also 
 Tumor-associated endothelial cells

References 

Tumor